Elvina Bay is a bay and adjacent suburb in northern Sydney, in the state of New South Wales, Australia. It is located 35 kilometres north of the Sydney central business district, in the local government area of Northern Beaches Council.

Elvina Bay is within the Ku-ring-gai Chase National Park, on the western shores of Pittwater, beside Lovett Bay. Scotland Island, Church Point and Morning Bay.  Clareville is on the opposite (eastern) Pittwater shore.

Bushwalkers can access Elvina Bay and neighbouring Lovett Bay via the Elvina Bay Circuit. The circuit includes access to the bottom and top of Lovett Falls.

References 

Suburbs of Sydney
Bays of New South Wales
Northern Beaches Council